Qarakorshaq (Old Turkic: 𐰚𐰀𐰺𐰀𐰚𐰗𐰺𐱁𐰀𐰚) is an animal-like mythical creature in Turkic mythology. Qarakorshaq is described as hiding in dark places, holes or abandoned houses, waiting to grab, carry away and devour its victim; but it can be scared away by light and noise. It has clumsy gait. Interpretation of Qarakorshaq's attributes leads to conclusion that Qarakorshaq is actually description of some real animals, that have already been regionally extinct in some parts of Anatolia and known only as legend.

Sources
 Türklerde Tabiat Üstü Varlıklar ve Bunlarla İlgili Kabuller, İnanmalar, Uygulamalar, Yrd.DoçDr. Ayşe DUVARCI "Kara-korşak"

References

External links
 Türklerde Doğa Üstü Varlıklar

Turkic legendary creatures